Jacques Roitfeld (19 January 1889 – 1999) was a Russian-born French film producer.

He is the father of Carine Roitfeld and Georges Roitfeld and the grandfather of Vladimir Restoin Roitfeld and Julia Restoin Roitfeld

Selected filmography
 Goodbye Darling (1946)
 A Friend Will Come Tonight (1946)
 Eternal Conflict (1948)
 Return to Life (1949)
 Between Eleven and Midnight (1949)
 Old Boys of Saint-Loup (1950)
 She and Me (1952)
 Charming Boys (1957)
 Agent 077: From the Orient with Fury (1965)
 Aces High (1976)

References

Bibliography
 Goble, Alan. The Complete Index to Literary Sources in Film. Walter de Gruyter, 1999.

External links

1889 births
1999 deaths
French film producers
Russian film producers
Emigrants from the Russian Empire to France
Russian Jews
Russian centenarians